Lunge is a surname. Notable people with the surname include:

 Georg Lunge (1839–1923), German chemist
 Jørgen Lunge (1577–1619), Danish nobleman
 Romilly Lunge (1904–1994), British actor
 Vincens Lunge ( 1486–1536), Danish diplomat